Acalyptris falkovitshi is a moth of the family Nepticulidae. It was described by Puplesis in 1984. It is known from Tunisia, Iran, Turkmenistan and Uzbekistan.

References

Nepticulidae
Moths of Asia
Moths described in 1984